Oscar Perez, Oscar Pérez and Óscar Pérez may refer to:

 Óscar Pérez (footballer, born 1973), Mexican football (soccer) player
 Óscar Pérez (footballer, born 1981), Spanish football (soccer) player
 Óscar Pérez Solís (1882–1951), Spanish artillery officer, engineer, journalist and politician
 Óscar Alberto Pérez (1981-2018), Venezuelan rebel leader
 Oscar García Perez (born 1966), Cuban fencer
 Oscar Pérez (basketball) (1922-2002), Argentine basketball player